Yang Wenjun (born December 25, 1983, in Fengcheng, Jiangxi) is a Chinese former flatwater canoeist who has competed since the early 2000s, the gold medalists at two Olympic Games, he won the Canadian canoe C-2 500 m gold medal both in 2004 and 2008.

As an Olympian and a competitive canoeist with master's degree graduated from Jiangxi Normal University,  Yang officially announced his retirement at the 2009 National Games end, made a short time comeback for competing in the 13th National Games  2013. He won many medals in major international and domestic competition events, he was three gold and one silver medalists in two Asian Games; he participated in four National Games from 2001 to 2013, won four gold medalists in later three National Games.

As Champions in two Olympic Games, Yang won much honour. He was the winner at the Best Group of CCTV Sports Personality Awards of Year 2008, the winner of the 2008 China Top Ten Benefiting Laureus Sports for Good. he also won the honor at the 2004 Top 10 Outstanding Youths of Jiangxi, the 2008 Top 10 Yichun People, the 2008 People Who Moved Fengcheng. Yang was selected the representative of 17th CCPC National Congress, he currently serves as the vice director, and a coach in Jiangxi Water Sports Administration Center on October 8, 2008, also the secretary of communist party committee.

Career 
Yang's first major international success came at the 2002 Asian Games where, aged only 18, he won two gold C-2 medals with Wang Bing. At the 2003 world championships in Gainesville, USA he was the youngest of the individual C-1 1000m finalists, finishing a very creditable seventh overall.

At the start of the 2004 season he formed a new C-2 partnership with the more experienced Meng, working under Canadian coach Marek Ploch. On their first international appearance together in Komatsu, Japan, they shocked observers by posting a 500 m time of 1:40.27. Then, in June, they won the prestigious Duisburg World Cup.

At the Olympic Games in Athens, they were drawn in the toughest heat alongside all the main medal contenders. They won the heat in a time of 1:38.916, almost a full second ahead of Cubans Rojas and Ledys Balceiro. The final was much closer with less than a second separating the first eight contenders but Meng and Yang again came out on top, beating the Cuban pair to win the gold medal.

After the Olympics, Yang returned to the C-1. At the 2005 World Championships in Zagreb, Croatia he raced over all three distances, despite the new compressed schedule, and finished sixth (500 m), seventh (1000 m) and tenth (200 m).

At the 2006 World Championships in Szeged, Hungary, Yang concentrated on the shorter distance events. He won the C-1 500 m bronze medal, China's first-ever men's world championship medal, and finished fifth in the C-1 200 m. Yang won another bronze in the C-1 500 m event at the following world championships in Duisburg.

Meng and Yang defended their Olympic title four years later despite their boat capsizing at the finish line after their win.

Yang is 177 cm (5'10") tall and weighs 77 kg (169 lbs).

References

Sports-reference.com profile

1983 births
Living people
People from Yichun, Jiangxi
Sportspeople from Jiangxi
Chinese male canoeists
Olympic canoeists of China
Olympic gold medalists for China
Olympic medalists in canoeing
Medalists at the 2004 Summer Olympics
Canoeists at the 2004 Summer Olympics
Medalists at the 2008 Summer Olympics
Canoeists at the 2008 Summer Olympics
Asian Games medalists in canoeing
Canoeists at the 2002 Asian Games
Canoeists at the 2006 Asian Games
ICF Canoe Sprint World Championships medalists in Canadian
Medalists at the 2002 Asian Games
Medalists at the 2006 Asian Games
Asian Games gold medalists for China
Asian Games silver medalists for China